The Reid House is a historic house located at 2013 S. Prairie Avenue in the Near South Side community area of Chicago, Illinois. Built in 1894, the house was designed by the firm Beers, Clay and Dutton in the Classical Revival style. The house's design features a narrow entry portico with Ionic columns and terra cotta decorations, a fanlight and sidelights on the front door, a cornice with a modillion, and Adamesque ornaments. In addition, the house was the first residence built with a steel frame. Chicago businessman William Henry Reid owned the house, which he built to replace his previous home at the same location.

The house was added to the National Register of Historic Places on August 21, 2003.

References

Houses on the National Register of Historic Places in Chicago
Colonial Revival architecture in Illinois
Neoclassical architecture in Illinois
Houses completed in 1894